Ali Al-Wardi was an Iraqi Social Scientist specialized in the field of Social history.

Early life and education 
Born in Kadhimiya, Baghdad in 1913, to a religious and very traditional family. He grew up defying his family's strict non-modern-educational policy, where his father wanted him to learn a craft instead of reading books. Nevertheless, Al-Wardi grew up with a disliking for work and crafts and a strong liking for books.

He managed to finish his elementary and high school and was awarded the number one student in the Kingdom of Iraq. He later was appointed as a teacher in different elementary and high schools across Iraq, before winning a scholarship to the American University of Beirut, where he received his bachelor's degree in 1943. He was back in Iraq and was forced into marriage per his father's orders.

A few years later, he traveled to the United States to attain his master's and PhD degrees. He earned his master's degree in 1948 from The University of Texas and his PhD in 1950 from the same university. During that time he used to spend his summers in the United Kingdom learning English in available institutes.

Career 
He came back to Iraq to start his career in writing many of his books based on the theory of Ibn Khaldun about Al-Badwa (Nomadic society) vs Al-Hadhara (Civil society).

Works 
The most important works of Ali Al-Wardi are:

 Psychological Insights from Modern Iraqi History
 A Study into the Nature of Iraqi Society
 The Personality of the Iraqi Individual: A Study of Iraqi Personality in Light of New Psychological Science
 The Sultans' Preachers
 The Mockery of the Human Mind
 Ibn Khaldoon's Teachings based on his Character, Civilization and Personality
 The Sage of the Fine Arts
 Dreams Between Science and Belief
 The Secrets of a Successful Personality
 That is How they Killed the Princess (water-cress)

In 2014, the Iraqi Ministry of Culture, through its publishing house, Dar al-Mamoon, has commissioned a team of the best Iraqi translators to translate al-Wardi's major work لمحات اجتماعية من تاريخ العراق الحديث (Social Glimpses of Iraq's Modern History), and Yasin T. al-Jibouri, is one of them. Al-Jibouri's contribution is the translation of Volume Six and its supplement which is renamed Volume Seven.

See also 
 Ibn al-Wardi

References

External links 

1913 births
1995 deaths
Writers from Baghdad
20th-century Iraqi historians
Iraqi anthropologists
Iraqi sociologists
Iraqi social sciences writers
American University of Beirut alumni
University of Texas alumni
Iraqi secularists
20th-century anthropologists